Lakshman Singh (also spelled Laxman Singh) is an Indian politician who represented the Indian National Congress (INC), and later its rival BJP in the Lok Sabha, the lower house of the Parliament of India. He is a 5 term Member of Parliament and 3 term Member of legislative Assembly.

Education & Personal Life
Lakshman Singh was born on 14 January 1955 in Indore, Madhya Pradesh. His father was Balbhadra Singh, who was an MLA (independent who supported Hindu Mahasabha) and had been the ruler of the former princely state of Raghogarh, the present day Guna district of Madhya Pradesh.
His elder brother Digvijaya Singh was the Chief Minister of Madhya Pradesh as well as a member of the Lok Sabha.
He studied at The Daly College, Indore, and St. Stephen's College, Delhi. 
In 1978, he married Jagrati Singh, and they later had a son and daughter. After her death he married Rubina Sharma in 2001.

Political career
Singh was thrice elected as a member of the Madhya Pradesh Legislative Assembly, from 1990-1992 and 1993–1994. Again in 2018 -  In 1994, he was elected to the 10th Lok Sabha in a by-election. He gained the second term in the 11th Lok Sabha in 1996 General Election and was elected to the 12th Lok Sabha in 1998 General Election. A further re-election followed in the 1999 General Election. All of these Lok Sabha elections were from the Rajgarh Lok Sabha constituency and as a candidate of the INC.

Singh switched political allegiance, joining the Bharatiya Janata Party (BJP), and was elected to the 14th Lok Sabha (2004-2009) from Rajgarh. But he lost the election for the 15th Lok Sabha, when Congress defeated BJP in Rajgarh constituency.

He returned to the Congress in January 2013.

References

Living people
1955 births
India MPs 1991–1996
India MPs 1996–1997
India MPs 1998–1999
India MPs 1999–2004
India MPs 2004–2009
St. Stephen's College, Delhi alumni
Indian National Congress politicians from Madhya Pradesh
Politicians from Indore
Bharatiya Janata Party politicians from Madhya Pradesh
Madhya Pradesh MLAs 1990–1992
Madhya Pradesh MLAs 1993–1998
People from Guna district
People from Rajgarh district
The Daly College Alumni